Gorga is a Spanish village and municipality located in the comarca of Comtat, Province of Alicante, in the Valencian Community.

Geography
Located in a confluence of the valleys of Seta and Travadell, it borders with the municipalities of Balones, Benasau, Benilloba, Cocentaina, Millena, Penàguila and Quatretondeta.

Gallery

References

External links

 Index of municipal statistics of Gorga (Diputación de Alicante website)

Municipalities in the Province of Alicante
Towns in Spain
Comtat